Ben Sinclair may refer to:

Ben Sinclair (actor), American actor, writer, director, and producer
Ben Sinclair (footballer), Australian former professional Australian rules footballer who played for the Collingwood Football Club